Vulin is a Serbo-Croatian surname, a patronymic of the given name Vule, a diminutive of Vuk. 

People with that name include:
Aleksandar Vulin (born 1972), Serbian politician
Dragan Vulin (born 1986), Croatian politician 
Lovre Vulin (born 1984), Croatian footballer

See also
Vulić

Serbian surnames
Croatian surnames